The 2018 FIM Motocross World Championship was the 62nd FIM Motocross World Championship season. It included 20 events, started at Neuquen in Argentina on 4 March, and ended at Imola in Italy on 30 September.
Jeffrey Herlings won the main championship.

Race Calendar and Results
A 20-round calendar for the 2018 season was announced on 25 October 2017.

MXGP

MX2

MXGP

Entry List

Riders Championship

Manufacturers Championship

MX2

Entry List

Riders Championship

Manufacturers Championship

References 

Motocross World Championship seasons
2018 in motorcycle sport